The Castle class was a class of British offshore patrol vessels of the Royal Navy. Two ships were constructed and after nearly 30 years service were sold to the Bangladesh Navy in 2010. The Bangladesh Navy upgraded these with more armaments including C-704 anti-ship missiles and sensors. These ships are now reclassified as corvettes by the Bangladesh Navy.

Design
The Castle class was designed by David K. Brown and was intended as a series of six offshore patrol vessels for the Royal Navy, designed in response to criticism of the previous  for insufficient speed, sub-optimal sea-keeping and lack of a flight deck for rescue helicopters.

Both vessels were built by Hall Russell in Aberdeen, Scotland. These had significant improvements over the Island-class – they were 300 tonnes larger, more stable in heavy seas,  faster and fitted with a large flight deck capable of supporting a Sea King helicopter. For brief periods, the ships could accommodate up to 120 troops.

Their primary mission was to serve with the Fishery Protection Squadron, protecting both the fishing fleets and the oil and gas fields of the North Sea. They could also serve as minelayers, and had detergent spraying facilities on board for dispersing oil slicks.

Operations
After the Falklands War, one ship was kept long-term in the Falkland Islands as a guard ship. Leeds Castle and Dumbarton Castle rotated the role on a three-yearly basis, although the ship's crew usually did a six-month rotation.

Replacement
Originally due to transfer to the Pakistan Maritime Security Agency in 2007, the deal fell through and both ships were sold to the Bangladesh Navy.

Ships in class

References

 Conway's All The World's Fighting Ships 1947–1995
 D.K. Brown, "The Design of the Castle Class", a personal view in Warship 2006, Conway's Maritime Press
 Janes Fighting Ships 2007

Patrol ship classes
Patrol vessels of the Royal Navy
Patrol vessels of the United Kingdom
Ship classes of the Royal Navy
Corvettes of the Bangladesh Navy
 
Ships built by Hall, Russell & Company